Rufat Abbasov (born 1 January 2005) is an Azerbaijani footballer who plays as a defender for Neftçi Baku in the Azerbaijan Premier League.

Club career
On 4 May 2022, Abbasov made his debut in the Azerbaijan Premier League for Neftçi Baku match against Sumgayit.

References

External links
 

2005 births
Living people
Association football defenders
Azerbaijani footballers
Azerbaijan Premier League players
Neftçi PFK players